Naldugari is a village in Bagdah block in Bangaon subdivision of North 24 Parganas district in the Indian state of West Bengal.

Transport 
The nearest railway stations are Ranaghat railway station on the Sealdah - Krishnanagar rail route and Bangaon railway station (32 km away) on the Sealdah - Bangaon line. Bus is available towards Bangaon, Chakdaha and Ranaghat from Satberia near the village. The nearest airport is at Dumdum, about 110 km away.

Attractions 

 Bibhutibhushan Wildlife Sanctuary (Parmadan Forest) (3.5 km).
 Mongolganj Indigo Kuthi (Back Side Of Parmadan Forest)
 Ichamati River - Place of birth of great Bengali author Shri Bibhutibhusan Bandopaddhyay at Chalki Barakpur (18 km)
 Bangladesh–India border at Petrapole near Bangaon - 30 km

References

Villages in North 24 Parganas district